Mesondo is a town in the Nyong-et-Kéllé department, Centre Region, Cameroon.

Transport 
It has a station on the Cameroon Railways.

See also 

 Railway stations in Cameroon
 Transport in Cameroon

References 

Populated places in Centre Region (Cameroon)